The 1st constituency of the Var (French: Première circonscription du Var) is a French legislative constituency in the Var département. Like the other 576 French constituencies, it elects one MP using the two-round system, with a run-off if no candidate receives over 50% of the vote in the first round.

Description

The 1st constituency of the Var covers the bulk of the naval city of Toulon on the Mediterranean Coast.

This constituency was one of only two in the department to elect a deputy from The Republicans in 2017 despite their total dominance of the department in the 2012 elections. In the 2022 elections, the constituency was the only one in the department not to elect a deputy from the far-right National Rally, instead returning a member from the centrist La République En Marche!.

Assembly members

Election results

2022

 
 
 
 
 
|-
| colspan="8" bgcolor="#E9E9E9"|
|-

2017

 
 
 
 
 
 
 
|-
| colspan="8" bgcolor="#E9E9E9"|
|-

2012

 
 
 
 
 
|-
| colspan="8" bgcolor="#E9E9E9"|
|-

2007

 
 
 
 
 
 
|-
| colspan="8" bgcolor="#E9E9E9"|
|-

2002

 
 
 
 
 
|-
| colspan="8" bgcolor="#E9E9E9"|
|-

September 1998 by-election
A by-election was called after the results of the constituency in the previous by-election were also invalidated.

 
 
  
|-
| colspan="8" bgcolor="#E9E9E9"|
|-

April-May 1998 by-election
A by-election was called after the results of the constituency in the 1997 election were invalidated.
 
 
 
  
|-
| colspan="8" bgcolor="#E9E9E9"|
|-

1997

 
 
 
 
 
 
|-
| colspan="8" bgcolor="#E9E9E9"|
|-
 
 

 
 
 
 
 

* RPR dissident

References

1